N. K. Singh Memorial English Preparatory School (also English Preparatory High School) is a private boarding school in Nepal. It was founded by Narjit Kumar Singh in 1967. It is one of the most reputed and renowned school in Nepal with 51 year old history .

Its main campus is located in Minbhawan, Baneshwor. It has a branch school at Lagan. Every year on 10 September the two campuses come together to celebrate its Founder Cum Foundation Day to commemorate the birthday of its late founder, Principal N. K. Singh.

Overview

N.K. Singh Memorial English Preparatory School is a co-educational institution located in Kathmandu that provides education from the pre-primary level up to grade 10. It was established in 1967 by late Mr. Narjit Kumar Singh.  The school was called English Preparatory School but was later changed to N.K Singh Memorial English Preparatory School in honor of its founder after his demise in 2000.

History

The school was one of the first private English medium co-ed boarding schools to open in Kathmandu.  It first started with only 7 students and 3 teachers in a tiny building at Bag Bazaar, Kathmandu.  It later shifted to Lagan before moving its main campus to Minbhawan.  The school still has a branch in Lagan.

Entrance
For Entry into the school, students must pass an entrance exam to gain admission into the school. Normally entrance examinations are taken for Nursery to Grade VII from 15th Chaitra.

Facilities
The school offers the many facilities which are as follows:

 Library and Resource Center which can accommodate 150 students at a time.
 Computer Lab only for use during computer classes.
 Science Lab.
 Transportation to some parts of the city for students.
 Canteen/Cafeteria.
 Medical 

During the past  51 Years the school has expanded greatly in its infrastructure starting from a small house to a huge campus comprising over four buildings with numerous fields and courts.

References

External links

Schools in Nepal
1967 establishments in Nepal